

Films

References

1988 in LGBT history
1988